Dmitry Nicolajevich Kardovsky (Russian: Дмитрий Николаевич Кардовский; 5 September 1866 – 9 February 1943) was a Russian artist, illustrator and stage designer.

Biography
He was born near Pereslavl-Zalessky in the Yaroslavl province. After studying law at Moscow University, he then studied at the Imperial Academy of Arts in St Petersburg from 1892, under Pavel Chistyakov and Ilya Repin. Kardovsky moved to Munich in 1896 with Igor Grabar and studied at the private studio of Anton Ažbe. He returned to St Petersburg in 1900 and received his diploma from the academy in 1902. He was appointed as professor of the academy in 1907.

Kardovsky explored various styles, including Impressionism and Jugendstil, but was  more concerned with faithful representation than formal experiment. From 1902, he was prolific as a book illustrator, and worked mainly on the Russian literary classics by Chekhov, Gogol, Lermontov and Tolstoy. He also dabbled with political caricature, providing illustrations for the radical journals Zhupel (Bugbear) and Adskaya Pochta from 1905 to 1906.

In 1934 Isaak Brodsky, a disciple of Ilya Repin was appointed director of the National Academy of Arts and the Leningrad Institute of Painting, Sculpture and Architecture. Brodsky invited Kardovsky among the most distinguished painters and pedagogues to teach at the academy. The system of master's workshops was restored at the Department of Painting. Students were assigned to one of the workshops after they completed their second-year courses. Professor Kardovsky had their own workshops. He also taught at the Moscow School of Painting, Sculpture and Architecture, where one of his students was Grigor Vahramian Gasparbeg.

He was an admirer of Mikhail Vrubel, whose posthumous exhibition he organized in 1912. Kardovsky died in Pereslavl-Zalessky in 1943.

Family
Dmitry was married to painter Olga Della-Vos-Kardovskaya (from 1900).

Students at the St Petersburg Academy of Arts 
 The Latvian born painter Frédéric Fiebig trained under his guidance in 1906. 
 The Socialist Realist artist Serafima Ryangina trained under Kardovsky between 1912–18 and 1921–23.

References

Bibliography 
 Ivanov, Sergei. "Unknown Socialist Realism. The Leningrad School". Saint Petersburg: NP-Print, 2007, .

External links 

artnet Biography

1866 births
1943 deaths
People from Pereslavl-Zalessky
19th-century painters from the Russian Empire
Russian male painters
20th-century Russian painters
Painters from Saint Petersburg
Imperial Academy of Arts alumni
Imperial Moscow University alumni
19th-century male artists from the Russian Empire
Full Members of the Imperial Academy of Arts
Moscow State University alumni
20th-century Russian male artists
Academic staff of the Moscow School of Painting, Sculpture and Architecture